Zdeněk Měšťan (born 31 May 1944 in Ostrava) is a Czechoslovak retired slalom canoeist who competed in the 1960s and 1970s. He won six medals at the ICF Canoe Slalom World Championships with a gold (C-2 team: 1965 Spittal), three silvers (C-2: 1969; C-2 team: 1967, 1969) and two bronzes (C-2: 1967,C-2 team: 1971).

Měšťan also finished 16th in the C-2 event at the 1972 Summer Olympics in Munich.

References

1944 births
Canoeists at the 1972 Summer Olympics
Czechoslovak male canoeists
Living people
Olympic canoeists of Czechoslovakia
Medalists at the ICF Canoe Slalom World Championships
Sportspeople from Ostrava